Espinasse's Reports, formally titled Reports of Cases argued and ruled at Nisi Prius, in the Courts of King's Bench and Common Pleas, from E. T., 33 Geo. III, to T. T. 47 Geo. III, is a collection of nominate reports by Isaac Espinasse, of nisi prius cases decided between 1793 and 1807. They are in six volumes. They may be cited as "Esp.".

Reprints
These reports are reprinted in volume 170 of the English Reports.

Accuracy

Glanville Williams said that this set of nominate reports has received more criticism related to their accuracy than any of the others. When a case from these reports was cited before Denman C.J., he said:

Pollock C.B. said that Espinasse only heard half of what went on in court and reported the other half. When a case from these reports was cited before  Maule J. he said that he did not care for Espinasse "or any other ass".

Ashton said that:

and that Espinasse went downhill as he got older.

References

Sets of reports reprinted in the English Reports